Communication!!! is the second studio album by American-born Japanese pop singer Leah Dizon. It was released on August 20, 2008 by Victor Entertainment. Dizon herself also wrote or co-wrote 10 of the tracks, along with composing 2 herself. It was released in a CD-only and CD + DVD format and it includes the title tracks from her two latest singles, Love Paradox and Vanilla, as well as two b-sides.

According to one press release, Lost At Sea and BxKxRxxx''' are said to be rock tunes, "her first".

It is Dizon's last recording before announcing her marriage and pregnancy in October 2008 on her Communication!!! Album Tour'' several days after the wedding.

CD track listing

DVD Track listing

References

2008 albums
Victor Entertainment albums